The Kesterson-Watkins House is a historic two-story farm house in Tazewell, Tennessee. It was built in 1900 by Gary H. Kesterson, a tobacco farmer, and designed in the Victorian architectural style. It was purchased by Kesterson's son-in-law, White Gibson, in 1920, and later inherited by Gibson's daughter, Thelma Gibson Watkins. It has been listed on the National Register of Historic Places since April 26, 1982.

References

National Register of Historic Places in Claiborne County, Tennessee
Victorian architecture in Tennessee
Houses completed in 1900